Grenada competed at the 2019 Pan American Games in Lima, Peru from July 26 to August 11, 2019.

On July 16, 2019 the Grenada Olympic Committee announced a team of 11 athletes (seven men and four women) in three sports (athletics, swimming and tennis). The team will also consist of seven officials.

During the opening ceremony of the games, javelin thrower Anderson Peters carried the flag of the country as part of the parade of nations. Peters would later go on to win the country's first ever Pan American Games gold medal.

Competitors
The following is the list of number of competitors (per gender) participating at the games per sport/discipline.

Medalists
The following competitors from Grenada won medals at the games. In the by discipline sections below, medalists' names are bolded.

Athletics (track and field)

Grenada qualified eight track and field athletes (six men and two women). The team won two medals, with Anderson Peters picking up gold in the javelin throw, and Lindon Victor picking up silver in the decathlon.

Key
Note–Ranks given for track events are for the entire round
Q = Qualified for the next round
NR = National record
GR = Games record
DNF = Did not finish
DNS = Did not start
NM = No mark

Track

Field events
Men

Combined events – Decathlon

Swimming

Grenada received two universality spots in swimming to enter one man and one woman.

Tennis

Grenada received one wild card to enter one female tennis player.

Women

See also
Grenada at the 2020 Summer Olympics

References

Nations at the 2019 Pan American Games
2019
2019 in Grenadian sport